Potato Chip Rock is a natural tourist attraction near San Diego, California. It is located on the Mt. Woodson summit and is famous for resembling a potato chip. It is located in an unincorporated part of San Diego County between Poway and Ramona. There is no drinking water, toilet facilities, or rangers along any route to Potato Chip Rock.  At least 400,000 hikers visit this San Diego open preserve each year.  

The rock is located at the top of the mountain, at an elevation between 2700 and 2800 ft. The hike to the rock takes approximately one to two hours. Potato Chip Rock sits 100 feet below the summit. One popular way to reach the rock is through a 6.6-mile round trip hike from the Lake Poway trailhead to the west. There are two other popular routes to the top that start on the east side of Mount Woodson. A short route begins from free parking areas along Route 67, with an entrance at 16310 Highway 67, and follows Mt. Woodson Road up to the rock. This 3.75-mile round-trip hike is paved and steep. The Fry-Kogel trail is the third route to the rock, and is about 4 miles long.

The rock is thin and more than 7 feet long, and it looks as if it is about to fall.

The rock was used as an April Fools' Day prank by Poway Mayor Steve Vaus in 2017. In a tweet, he wrote that part of the rock had snapped off and fallen into Lake Poway below. He even added a picture for "proof".

Also located on the trail from Lake Poway to Potato Chip Rock is Sandcrawler Rock, named for its resemblance to the Sandcrawler transport vehicle from the Star Wars Universe.

References 

Geography of San Diego County, California
Landmarks in San Diego
Parks in San Diego
Tourist attractions in San Diego County, California